Phosphorus pentafluoride, PF5, is a phosphorus halide. It is a colourless, toxic gas that fumes in air.

Preparation
Phosphorus pentafluoride was first prepared in 1876 by the fluorination of phosphorus pentachloride using arsenic trifluoride, which remains a favored method:
3 PCl5  +  5 AsF3  →   3 PF5  +  5 AsCl3

Phosphorus pentafluoride can be prepared by direct combination of phosphorus and fluorine:

 P4 + 10 F2 → 4 PF5

Structure
Single-crystal X-ray studies indicate that the PF5 has trigonal bipyramidal geometry.  Thus it has two distinct types of P−F bonds (axial and equatorial): the length of an axial P−F bond is distinct from  the equatorial P−F bond in the solid phase, but not the liquid or gas phases due to Berry pseudo rotation.

Fluorine-19 NMR spectroscopy, even at temperatures as low as −100 °C, fails to distinguish the axial from the equatorial fluorine environments.  The apparent equivalency arises from the low barrier for pseudorotation via the Berry mechanism, by which the axial and equatorial fluorine atoms rapidly exchange positions.  The apparent equivalency of the F centers in PF5 was first noted by Gutowsky. The explanation was first described by R. Stephen Berry, after whom the Berry mechanism is named.  Berry pseudorotation influences the 19F NMR spectrum of PF5 since NMR spectroscopy operates on a millisecond timescale.  Electron diffraction and X-ray crystallography do not detect this effect as the solid state structures are, relative to a molecule in solution, static and can not undergo the necessary changes in atomic position.

Lewis acidity
Phosphorus pentafluoride is a Lewis acid.  This property is relevant to its ready hydrolysis. A well studied adduct is PF5 with pyridine. With primary and secondary amines, the adducts convert readily to dimeric amido-bridged derivatives with the formula [PF4(NR2)]2. A variety of complexes are known with bidentate ligands.

Hexafluorophosphoric acid (HPF6) is derived from phosphorus pentafluoride and hydrogen fluoride. Its conjugate base, hexafluorophosphate (PF6–), is a useful non-coordinating anion.

References

Phosphorus(V) compounds
Phosphorus fluorides